CFFB-TV was the television call sign for the former CBC's television transmitter in Iqaluit, Nunavut. It repeated the CBC North service, which consisted of the regular national CBC Television schedule in Mountain Time, with the addition of the northern news programs CBC Igalaaq in Inuktitut at 6 p.m. and 7:30 p.m. (Eastern Time) and CBC Northbeat in English at 8 p.m. (Eastern Time).

No television programs originated at CFFB-TV.

History
During its life, CFFB-TV was always licensed as a repeater; in its last year before its closedown, it was licensed by the CRTC as a repeater of CFYK-TV in Yellowknife. As a result, CFFB and its network of rebroadcasters was one of many CBC and Radio-Canada's remaining analogue transmitters closed on July 31, 2012, as part of several austerity measures announced in April 2012 to keep the corporation solvent and in operation. As a result, this leaves almost the entirety of Nunavut without any terrestrial CBC television service, with only community-owned rebroadcasters of CFYK remaining in Clyde River and Whale Cove, along with one carrying Radio-Canada's Montreal station CBFT-DT in Iqaluit.  However, CFYK maintains a bureau at CFFB's former studios that produces Nunavut-focused stories for Igalaaq and Northbeat. Additionally, few viewers in Nunavut actually lost access to CBC programming due to the extremely high penetration of cable and satellite, a must for acceptable television in this remote area.

Transmitters
Other communities in Nunavut received the same service, delivered to transmitters in the communities by satellite from the main CBC network.

CFFB-TV had 12 analog television re-transmitters throughout the territory of Nunavut.

None of CBC or Radio-Canada's television re-transmitters were converted to digital.

See also
CBC North

References

External links
CBC North
 

FFB
Mass media in Iqaluit
FFB
Television channels and stations established in 1972
Television channels and stations disestablished in 2012
1972 establishments in Canada
2012 disestablishments in Nunavut
FFB-TV